The following highways are numbered 100A:

United States
 County Road 100A (Bradford County, Florida)
 County Road 100A (Columbia County, Florida)
 County Road 100A (Union County, Florida)
 Maine State Route 100A
 New York State Route 100A
 Vermont Route 100A